Agathotoma secalis is a species of sea snail, a marine gastropod mollusk in the family Mangeliidae.

Distribution
This species occurs in the Pacific Ocean off Mexico.

References

 Shasky, D.R. (1971) Ten new species of tropical Eastern Pacific Turridae. The Veliger, 14, 67–72, 1 pl.

External links
  Tucker, J.K. 2004 Catalog of recent and fossil turrids (Mollusca: Gastropoda). Zootaxa 682:1-1295.

secalis
Gastropods described in 1971